Mongolia competed at the 1998 Winter Olympics in Nagano, Japan from February 7 to 22. Mongolia's team consisted of 1 cross-country skier, who was Dashzevegiin Ochirsükh, and two short track speed skaters, who were Battulgyn Oktyabri and Boldyn Sansarbileg.

Cross-country skiing

Men

C = Classical style, F = Freestyle

Short track speed skating

Men

References
Official Olympic Reports
 Olympic Winter Games 1998, full results by sports-reference.com

Nations at the 1998 Winter Olympics
1998 Winter Olympics
1998 in Mongolian sport